Marine Chemistry is an international peer-reviewed scientific journal for publications in the field of chemistry in the marine environment. The journal is currently published by Elsevier. Its editor-in-chief is T.S. Bianchi. According to the Journal Citation Reports, Marine Chemistry has a 2020 impact factor of 3.807.

References

External links 

Chemistry journals
Chemical oceanography
English-language journals
Monthly journals